In mathematics, especially in sheaf theory—a domain applied in areas such as topology, logic and algebraic geometry—there are four image functors for sheaves that belong together in various senses.

Given a continuous mapping f: X → Y of topological spaces, and the category Sh(–) of sheaves of abelian groups on a topological space. The functors in question are

 direct image f∗ : Sh(X) → Sh(Y)
 inverse image f∗ : Sh(Y) → Sh(X)
 direct image with compact support f! : Sh(X) → Sh(Y)
 exceptional inverse image Rf! : D(Sh(Y)) → D(Sh(X)).

The exclamation mark is often pronounced "shriek" (slang for exclamation mark), and the maps called "f shriek" or "f lower shriek" and "f upper shriek"—see also shriek map.

The exceptional inverse image is in general defined on the level of derived categories only. Similar considerations apply to étale sheaves on schemes.

Adjointness
The functors are adjoint to each other as depicted at the right, where, as usual,  means that F is left adjoint to G (equivalently G right adjoint to F), i.e. 
Hom(F(A), B) ≅ Hom(A, G(B))
for any two objects A, B in the two categories being adjoint by F and G.

For example, f∗ is the left adjoint of f*. However, these are almost never isomorphisms—see the localization example below.

Verdier duality
Verdier duality gives another link between them: morally speaking, it exchanges "∗" and "!", i.e. in the synopsis above it exchanges functors along the diagonals. For example the direct image is dual to the direct image with compact support. This phenomenon is studied and used in the theory of perverse sheaves.

Base Change
Another useful property of the image functors is base change.

Localization
In the particular situation of a closed subspace i: Z ⊂ X and the complementary open subset j: U ⊂ X, the situation simplifies insofar that for j∗=j! and i!=i∗ and for any sheaf F on X, one gets exact sequences
0 → j!j∗ F → F → i∗i∗ F → 0
Its Verdier dual reads
i∗Ri! F → F → Rj∗j∗ F → i∗Ri! F[1],
a distinguished triangle in the derived category of sheaves on X.

The adjointness relations read in this case
 
and
.

See also
Six operations

References
  treats the topological setting
  treats the case of étale sheaves on schemes. See Exposé XVIII, section 3.
  is another reference for the étale case.

Sheaf theory